Myra Kukiiyaut (1929-2006) was an Inuit artist. Kukiiyaut was known for her works on paper, including drawing and printmaking. She also worked with sculpture and textiles.  

Kukiiyaut was born in Baker Lake, Northwest Territories (now Nunavut).  Her work is included in the collections of the National Gallery of Canada and the McMichael Canadian Art Collection.

References

20th-century Canadian women artists
21st-century Canadian women artists
1929 births
2006 deaths
20th-century Canadian artists
21st-century Canadian artists
Inuit artists